Jessie Ware is a British singer and songwriter who has received various recognitions including six Brit Awards nominations, a Mercury Prize nomination and a MTV Europe Music Award nomination. She released her debut album Devotion in 2012. The album peaked at number five on the UK Albums Chart and was met with positive reviews from critics and received a nomination for the Mercury Prize. At the 2013 Brit Awards, Ware received two nominations, for British Breakthrough Artist and for British Female Solo Artist. She also received the award for Best Newcomer at the Silver Clef Awards and a nomination for the same category at the MOBO Awards.

Her second album, Tough Love was released in 2014. The title track "Tough Love" was released as album's first single and received nominations for Best Pop Video - UK at the 2014 UK Music Video Awards and the Popjustice £20 Music Prize for Best British Pop Single. In 2015, she received a second nomination for the Brit Award for British Female Solo Artist and was nominated for the MTV Europe Music Award for Best World Stage Performance at the 2015 MTV Europe Music Awards for her live performance at MTV Crashes Cork. In 2017, she released her third album Glasshouse and received her third Brit Award nomination for British Female Solo Artist at the 2018 Brit Awards. In the same year she started the podcast Table Manners alongside her mother; the project has received nominations for Best Podcast at the Audio and Radio Industry Awards and Best Entertainment Podcast at the British Podcast Awards. Her fourth album What's Your Pleasure? was released in 2020 to critical acclaim; at the 2021 Brit Awards, the album was nominated for British Album of the Year while Ware received a fourth nomination for British Female Solo Artist.

Brit Awards
The Brit Awards are presented by the British Phonographic Industry to honour excellence in music both from the United Kingdom and the world.

British Podcast Awards
The British Podcast Awards recognise the best in podcasts from Great Britain.

Mercury Prize
The Mercury Prize is presented annually to the best album of the year by a British or Irish artist.

MOBO Awards
The MOBO Awards or Music of Black Origin Awards are presented by the MOBO Organisation to recognise the excellence in music of black origin.

MTV Europe Music Awards
The MTV Europe Music Awards are presented annually by the ViacomCBS International Media Networks Europe to honour the best in pop culture.

Popjustice £20 Music Prize
The Popjustice £20 Music Prize is presented by the music website Popjustice to recognise the best British pop single of the previous year.

UK Music Video Awards
The UK Music Video Awards is an annual celebration of creativity, technical excellence and innovation in music video and moving image for music from United Kingdom and the world.

Various awards and nominations

References

External links
 

Lists of awards received by British musician